Don't Do It is a 1994 comedy film and the directorial debut of Eugene Hess who also wrote the screenplay. It stars Heather Graham, James Le Gros, Sheryl Lee and James Marshall.

Plot
The film is about the secret desires of three young couples in Los Angeles: Suzanna and Dodger, Alicia and Robert, and Michelle and Charles. One member of each couple secretly falls in love with a former lover. Dodger is still attracted to his ex-girlfriend Alicia, while Alicia is pregnant with Robert's Child. Robert is still attracted to Michelle, whose boyfriend is Charles. Charles still loves Suzanna. Their real feelings come out when they meet at a café in Los Angeles.

Cast
Heather Graham as Suzanna
James Le Gros as Dodger
Sheryl Lee as Michelle
Esai Morales as Charles
James Marshall as Robert
Sarah Trigger as Alicia
Balthazar Getty as Jake
Alexis Arquette as David

Background
Heather Graham, Sheryl Lee and James Marshall previously starred together in the television series Twin Peaks and the following film Twin Peaks: Fire Walk With Me. Lee and Marshall also starred in the show's revival, alongside Balthazar Getty.

References

External links
 

1994 films
American independent films
1994 comedy films
1990s English-language films
1990s American films